The Knox Rugby Club, formerly known as Knox Old Boys RUFC, is a rugby union football club which plays in Division One of the New South Wales Suburban Rugby Union and is based in Sydney, Australia. The club has won the Kentwell Cup, among other trophies.

History
The club was founded by and is associated with the ex-students association of Knox Grammar School, a Uniting Church day and boarding school for boys, located in Wahroonga, an upper North Shore suburb of Sydney. The club won the New South Wales Suburban Rugby Union's Kentwell Cup in 2005 and 2009.

Notable players
 Ross Turnbull – Australia (1968)

Two Knox players became Chairman of the Australian Rugby Union; Ross Turnbull and David Clark.

Past Premierships

Club Championships

1st Grade Premierships: 6

2nd Grade Premierships: 7

3rd Grade Premierships: 10

4th Grade Premierships: 2 

*Denotes joint premiership with Waverley.

5th Grade Premierships: 1

Colts Premierships: 7

See also
Rugby union in New South Wales
List of Old Knox Grammarians

References

External links

Rugby union teams in Sydney
Rugby clubs established in 1959
1959 establishments in Australia